The  Grand Pabos West River or Pabos West River (French : Rivière du Grand Pabos Ouest) is a river in the Gaspé Peninsula of Quebec, Canada, which has its source in streams of the Chic-Choc Mountains in the Mont-Alexandre, Quebec sector. Its name comes from the Mi'kmaq word pabog meaning "tranquility waters"

Salmon fishing
The Grand Pabos West River is known for its Atlantic Salmon (salmo salar) fishing. The river was a renowned salmon river from 1880 to 1950. Overfished, the salmon were almost completely annihilated in 1984 and the river was closed to fisherman. It has been reopened since 2003.
The water of the Pabos West River is of a copper color and is not as crystal clear as the one of the other 2 Pabos rivers but still fairly transparent.

Access and administration
The river is accessible via Quebec Route 132 and is managed by an organism that administrates salmon fishing on the 3 Pabos Rivers. It is easy to fish the Grand Pabos River and the Petit Pabos River on the same fishing trip.

See also
List of rivers of Quebec
Grand Pabos River
Petit Pabos River

References

External links

Rivers of Gaspésie–Îles-de-la-Madeleine
Gaspé Peninsula